Melinda Sun (born 23 February 1995) is an Australian badminton player. In 2013, she won the bronze medal at the Oceania Junior Championships in the mixed doubles event partnered with Pit Seng Low. In 2016, she won the silver medal at the Oceania Championships in the women's doubles event partnered with Gronya Somerville.

Achievements

Oceania Championships
Women's doubles

Oceania Junior Championships
Mixed doubles

References

External links 

 

Living people
1995 births
Australian people of Chinese descent
Australian female badminton players